Sirivara  is a village in the southern state of Karnataka, India. It is located in the Tumkur taluk of Tumkur district in Karnataka.

The village is famous for the temple of Sri Anjaneya Swamy, which was reconstructed  during 2009-2010.

See also
 Tumkur

References

Villages in Tumkur district